The 2016 Cronulla-Sutherland Sharks season is the 50th in the club's history. Coached by Shane Flanagan and captained by Paul Gallen, they competed in the NRL's 2016 Telstra Premiership, finishing the regular season 3rd (out of 16) to make the finals.

In the first week on the finals, they took on the Canberra Raiders, who at that stage were on a 10-game winning streak, at GIO Stadium. A day before the game, Sharks captain, Paul Gallen did not take the trip and was ruled out with a back injury. 7 minutes into the game, stand-in captain Wade Graham was taken off the field and would not return due to a concussion. Despite playing with one less player (16) for more than 70 minutes, the Sharks managed to earn a week off and advance to the preliminary finals with a 16-14 win, one of the Sharks' more memorable wins in their history.

In the preliminary final, they took on the North Queensland Cowboys, who managed to narrowing beat the Brisbane Broncos in a 90-minute thriller the week before, at Allianz Stadium. Paul Gallen and Wade Graham returned from their respective injuries to line up in a near fully strengthed Cronulla side. With James Maloney and Chad Townsend leading the way, the Sharks defeated the Cowboys 32-20 to progress into the 2016 NRL Grand Final, their first grand final appearance since the 1997 Super League Season. It was only the fourth time they had appeared in a grand final in their history.

Playing in front of 83,625 fans, the Cronulla Sharks broke their 49 year drought without a premiership, with a 14-12 win over the minor premiers, the Melbourne Storm. It sent Michael Ennis out a winner in his final game in the NRL. The Clive Churchill Medal Winner was Luke Lewis.

Results

 Round 1 - North Queensland Cowboys vs Cronulla Sharks (20-14)
Tries: Chad Townsend, Jack Bird

 Round 2 - Cronulla Sharks vs St George Illawarra Dragons (30-2)
Tries: Ben Barba, Valentine Holmes, Chad Townsend, Jayson Bukuya, Ricky Leutele

 Round 3 - Manly Sea Eagles vs Cronulla Sharks (22-12)
Tries: Luke Lewis, Valentine Holmes

 Round 4 - Cronulla Sharks vs Melbourne Storm (14-6)
Tries: Ben Barba, Chad Townsend

 Round 5 - Wests Tigers vs Cronulla Sharks (26-34)
Tries: Luke Lewis, James Maloney, Sosaia Feki, Paul Gallen, Ben Barba

 Round 6 - Cronulla Sharks vs Gold Coast Titans (25-20)
Tries: Ben Barba, Sosaia Feki, Matt Prior, Andrew Fifita, Valentine Holmes

Field Goal: Chad Townsend

 Round 7 - Canberra Raiders vs Cronulla Sharks (16-40)
Tries: Ben Barba (2), Jack Bird, Jayson Bukuya, Valentine Holmes, Matt Prior, James Maloney

 Round 8 - Cronulla Sharks vs Penrith Panthers (20-18)
Tries: Michael Ennis, James Maloney, Valentine Holmes

 Round 9 - Cronulla Sharks vs Brisbane Broncos (30-28)
Tries: Sosaia Feki (2), Paul Gallen, James Maloney, Chad Townsend

 Round 10 - Newcastle Knights vs Cronulla Sharks (0-62)
Tries: Valentine Holmes (4), Sosaia Feki (3), Luke Lewis (2), Ben Barba, Wade Graham

 Round 11 - Cronulla Sharks vs Manly Sea Eagles (20-12)
Tries: Sosaia Feki, Valentine Holmes, Ben Barba

 Round 13 - Canterbury Bulldogs vs Cronulla Sharks (18-20)
Tries: Chad Townsend, Valentine Holmes, Ben Barba, Ricky Leutele

 Round 14 - Cronulla Sharks vs North Queensland Cowboys (13-10)
Tries: Valentine Holmes

Field Goal: James Maloney

 Round 16 - Cronulla Sharks vs New Zealand Warriors (19-18)
Tries: Michael Ennis, Ricky Leutele, Jayson Bukuya

Field Goal: James Maloney

 Round 17 - Cronulla Sharks vs Parramatta Eels (34-24)
Sosaia Feki (2), Ricky Leutele (2), Gerard Beale (2)

 Round 18 - Penrith Panthers vs Cronulla Sharks (10-26)
Tries: Ben Barba (2), Mitch Brown, Joseph Paulo, Luke Lewis

 Round 19 - Sydney Roosters vs Cronulla Sharks (20-32)
Tries: Sosaia Feki (2), Valentine Holmes, Jack Bird, Luke Lewis, Chad Townsend

 Round 20 - Cronulla Sharks vs Newcastle Knights (36-4)
Tries: Jack Bird (2), Ben Barba (2), Valentine Holmes (2), Sosaia Feki, Gerard Beale

 Round 21 - Gold Coast Titans vs Cronulla Sharks (18-18)
Tries: Valentine Holmes, Jack Bird, Andrew Fifita

 Round 22 - Cronulla Sharks vs Canberra Raiders (14-30)
Tries: James Maloney, Paul Gallen

 Round 23 - St George Illawarra Dragons vs Cronulla Sharks (32-18)
Tries: Valentine Holmes, Ben Barba, Ricky Leutele

 Round 24 - South Sydney Rabbitohs vs Cronulla Sharks (12-6)
Tries: Wade Graham

 Round 25 - Cronulla Sharks vs Sydney Roosters (37-12)
Tries: Matt Prior, Ben Barba, Gerard Beale, Paul Gallen, Jayson Bukuya, Valentine Holmes

Field Goal: James Maloney

 Round 26 - Melbourne Storm vs Cronulla Sharks (26-6)
Tries: Gerard Beale

 Qualifying Finals - Canberra Raiders vs Cronulla Sharks (14-16)
Tries: Matt Prior, Valentine Holmes

 Preliminary Finals - Cronulla Sharks vs North Queensland Cowboys (32-20)
Tries: James Maloney (2), Sosaia Feki, Chad Townsend, Luke Lewis

 2016 NRL Grand Final - Melbourne Storm vs Cronulla Sharks (12-14)
Tries: Ben Barba, Andrew Fifita

Clive Churchill Medal Winner: Luke Lewis

Ladder

2016 Statistics

Top 5 Point Scorers

Top 5 Try Scorers

Top 5 Try Assisters

Top 5 Tacklers

Top 5 Running Metres

Cronulla-Sutherland Sharks seasons
Cronulla-Sutherland Sharks season